Halpern Point is a point on the northern coast of Trinity Peninsula, Antarctica, directly south of the eastern part of the Duroch Islands. It was named by the Advisory Committee on Antarctic Names for Martin Halpern of the Geophysical and Polar Research Center, University of Wisconsin, Madison, leader of the field party which geologically mapped this area, 1961–62.

References

Headlands of Trinity Peninsula